Tähemaa is a village in Peipsiääre Parish, Tartu County in Estonia. As of 2021, the village has a population of 60.

References

Villages in Tartu County